Nealon Greene (born April 13, 1976) is a retired American-born Canadian football quarterback who was active for nine seasons in the CFL. He played college football at Clemson University.

Early life
Greene was born in Yonkers, New York.  When finishing high school, he was recruited by Rich Bisaccia, the new running backs and special teams coach at Clemson University in South Carolina.  Bissacia was also from Yonkers and Greene knew him through his family.

Pro career
After spending his collegiate career with Clemson, where he became the school's career leader in passing yardage, Greene came to the Canadian Football League with the Toronto Argonauts. Greene was traded in 1999 to the Edmonton Eskimos before he could establish himself on the Argonauts, but played well enough to stay with the team for a few seasons. On July 16, 1999, Greene set a CFL record for rushing yards in a single game by a quarterback with 180 yards. He became the clear Eskimos starter in 2000 while posting a 10-8 record and second-place finish. The Eskimos narrowly lost the west semi final to the BC Lions by a score of 34-32 after a seemingly easy but missed field goal by kicker Sean Fleming which would have sealed the win. The loss resulted in the firing of head coach Don Matthews which led to Greene losing the starting quarterback role to Jason Maas during the 2001 season. Greene was subsequently traded to the Saskatchewan Roughriders with Simon Baffoe and a second round pick (offensive lineman Francois Boulianne) in the 2002 CFL Draft for offensive lineman Dan Comiskey, running back Darren Davis, and kicker Mike O'Brien.

Greene immediately became the starter in Saskatchewan starting the 2002 season improving the then woeful Roughriders to an 8-10 record, making the playoffs for the first time since their 1997 Grey Cup appearance. In 2003 Greene played sixteen games for the Roughriders, posting a 10-6 record as a starter, leading Saskatchewan to their first winning season since 1994. They defeated the Winnipeg Blue Bombers 37-21 in the first round of the postseason before losing to the Edmonton Eskimos in the western final by a score of 30-23.

The successful season of 2003 and further advancements having been made in the playoffs left the Roughriders fans looking positive. However, in the first game of the 2004 season against the Toronto Argonauts, Greene suffered a season-ending broken leg which resulted in a disappointing 9-9 season for Saskatchewan under back-up quarterback Henry Burris. Greene recovered and returned in the 2005 season, where he retained the role of starter after the departure of Burris. The up-and-down season struggles saw the team start strongly with a 3-1 record, but fall to a disappointing 3-6 by the halfway point of the season. Seeing that change was necessary, Greene was benched and lost the starting role to back-up Marcus Crandell. Crandell quarterbacked the Riders to five straight victories during Greene's time on the bench, but later lost three crucial games in a row near the end of the season dropping the Roughriders to below .500 once again with an 8-9 record. Having nothing to lose, head coach Danny Barrett then returned to Greene to start in the last regular season game in BC. Greene led the Riders to victory in his final CFL start, salvaging another disappointing 9-9 season for the green and white. Although the season resulted in a last place finish in the west, Greene and the Roughriders had a stronger record than the third-place team in the east, the Ottawa Renegades, entitling the Roughriders to cross over divisions and make the eastern playoffs. However, despite the victory against the league-leading BC Lions the previous week under Greene, he was benched again in favor of Crandell and never saw any playing time in the ensuing 30-14 loss to the Montreal Alouettes in the east semi final.

On April 20, 2006 Greene was traded by Saskatchewan to the Montreal Alouettes where he reunited with head coach Don Matthews and served as a back-up quarterback to Anthony Calvillo. Despite Calvillo's struggles and poor play later in the season, he remained the starter and Greene was never given a chance to start a game for Montreal. Greene was cut the following season after Matthews resigned as head coach.

Greene retired from pro football, he returned to Clemson University and continued his education.

References

External links
Greene's profile and career statistics on the official CFL website

1976 births
Living people
African-American players of Canadian football
American football quarterbacks
Canadian football quarterbacks
Clemson Tigers football players
Edmonton Elks players
Montreal Alouettes players
Sportspeople from Yonkers, New York
Players of American football from New York (state)
Toronto Argonauts players
Saskatchewan Roughriders players
21st-century African-American sportspeople
20th-century African-American sportspeople